Piz Schumbraida is a mountain of the Ortler Alps, located on the border between Italy and Switzerland. It lies east of Piz Tea Fondada.

References

External links
 Piz Schumbraida on Hikr

Ortler Alps
Mountains of the Alps
Alpine three-thousanders
Mountains of Switzerland
Mountains of Italy
Mountains of Graubünden
Italy–Switzerland border
International mountains of Europe